Seneca Falls may refer to:

 Seneca Falls, New York, a town in the United States
 Seneca Falls (CDP), New York, a hamlet in the United States
 The Seneca Falls Convention (1848), the first women's rights convention
 "Seneca Falls", a song by The Distillers from the album Sing Sing Death House
 Seneca Falls, one of 24 named waterfalls in Ricketts Glen State Park in Pennsylvania